Mazhan is a town under the jurisdiction of Cangnan County, Wenzhou City, Zhejiang Province, People's Republic of China.

Administrative Divisions 
 the following village-level administrative divisions are under the jurisdiction of Mazhan:

Puyun Community, Yuliaowan Community, Pumen Community, Qiaotou Village, Houxian Village, Xiafeng Village, Fengweishan Village, Jinshan Village, Qipan Village, Cheling Village, Zhongkui Village, Xiakui Village, Damenyang Village, Pufeng Village, Ganxi Village, Ximenwai Village, Wucheng Village, Chengmending Village, Xiyu Village, Zhongxiaogu Village, Chong'an Village, Lanshan Village, Caoyu Village, Xing'ao Village, and Mazhan Fruit Farm Residential Zone.

References 

Cangnan County
Township-level divisions of Zhejiang